Saftuk (also Romanized as Saftūk; also known as Saftūk-e Pā’īn, Saftūk Pā’īn, and Saftūq) is a village in Qaen Rural District, in the Central District of Qaen County, South Khorasan Province, Iran. At the 2006 census, its population was 248, in 81 families.

References 

Populated places in Qaen County